The women's team of five competition at the 2010 Asian Games in Guangzhou was held on 21 and 22 November 2010 at Tianhe Bowling Hall.

Schedule
All times are China Standard Time (UTC+08:00)

Results

References 

Results at ABF Website
Bowling Digital

External links
Bowling Site of 2010 Asian Games

Women's team